Salvador Paskowitz is an American screenwriter, producer and son of surfer Dorian Paskowitz and Juliette Paskowitz.

His writing credits include The Age of Adaline. He is executive producing St. Lucy's Home for Girls Raised by Wolves for ABC. He also starred as himself in Surfwise, a documentary about his family.

The seventh son of eight brothers and one sister from a surfing family, Paskowitz's origins began as part of the Action Sports community, living in Orange County, California, for many years as well as attending classes at The Art Students League of New York City—classically trained in oil on canvas. Later he owned a graphic design company whose clients included Billabong and Hurley Sportswear. Salvador also published as a teenager Surf Crazed and Wave Warrior comics, which was featured in Surfing Magazine. An avid reader since childhood days of traveling and surfing Salvador turned to screenwriting full-time in 2007.

Salvador is married to Kristin Paskowitz and they have two children. They live in the Los Angeles area.

References

American screenwriters
Living people
Year of birth missing (living people)
Paskowitz family